The Embassy of Peru in Washington, D.C., also known as the Emily J. Wilkins House, is the diplomatic mission of the Republic of Peru to the United States. It is located at 1700 Massachusetts Avenue, Northwest, Washington, D.C., in the Embassy Row neighborhood.

The embassy also operates Consulate-Generals in Atlanta, Boston, Chicago, Dallas, Denver, Hartford, Houston, Los Angeles, Miami, New York City, Paterson, New Jersey, San Francisco. 

Since October 2021, Oswaldo de Rivero has been the ambassador of Peru to the United States.

The Residence of the Ambassador is Battery Terrill, a Colonial Revival-styled mansion located in Northwest Washington, D.C. The 25-acre estate of wooded land adjoining Rock Creek Park is considered the largest private property in Washington, D.C.

History
The building was designed by Jules Henri de Sibour.
Beriah Wilkins lived there; he married Emily Wilkins. Their son John F. Wilkins inherited the property in 1910. He married Julia C. Wilkins; they entertained there. 

In 1946, Australia purchased the property. On January 31, 1973, Australia sold the property to the Republic of Peru.

References

External links

Official website
wikimapia

Peru
Washington, D.C.
Peru–United States relations
Peru
Dupont Circle